Shin Tae-yong (Hanja: 申台龍; born on 11 October 1970) is a South Korean former professional footballer and manager who is currently coaching the Indonesia national football team. He is the first man to win the Asian Club Championship/AFC Champions League as both player and manager, having won the 1995 Asian Club Championship and the 2010 AFC Champions League with Seongnam Ilhwa Chunma.

Club career
After graduating from Yeungnam University, Shin spent 12 seasons playing for Ilhwa Chunma. He won the K League Young Player of the Year Award in 1992, the first year of his professional career. He was a key player for Ilhwa Chunma when they won the K League for three consecutive years from 1993 to 1995. Especially in 1995, he became the Most Valuable Player of the K League, and also won the Asian Club Championship in the end of the year. Afterwards, Ilhwa Chunma faltered for a while, but they succeeded in conquering the league again under Shin's contribution. They once again won the league for three consecutive years from 2001 to 2003, and he also won his second MVP Award in 2001. He scored 99 goals and provided 68 assists in 401 matches in the K League, as well as the Korean League Cup. He could become a one-club man, but came to Australia to play for the Queensland Roar in the A-League. He is regarded as one of the greatest K League players of all time, and was selected for the K League 30th Anniversary Best XI in 2013.

Drafted by the Queensland Roar in the Australian A-League in 2005, he retired due to an ankle problem. He accepted an assistant coaching role at the club, assisting Miron Bleiberg primarily with technical skills.

He played 23 international matches including at the 1996 AFC Asian Cup for the South Korea national team.

Style of play
As a player, he was an attacking midfielder. He earned the nickname "Fox of the Ground" by clearly distinguishing when passing and dribbling with sensual and intelligent play.

Managerial career

Seongnam Ilhwa Chunma
In 2009, Shin became the caretaker manager of Seongnam, leading the team to second place in both the 2009 K League and the 2009 Korean FA Cup, though suffered from a lack of funds. He signed a permanent contract the next year and immediately brought success, winning the 2010 AFC Champions League and the 2011 Korean FA Cup. He became the first man to win the AFC Champions League as both player and manager. However, the team's performance declined in the 2012 season, aggravated by the death of Sun Myung Moon, the founder of the Unification Church which owned the club, in the middle of the season. He eventually resigned from Seongnam after finishing the season.

South Korea

In August 2014, he became the assistant coach of the South Korea national team. Under Shin, South Korea reached the Asian Cup final for the first time in 27 years. South Korea's manager at that time was Uli Stielike, but the actual coaching role was performed by Shin, who took charge of the tactics and training of the team.

Shin also managed the South Korea under-23 team at the same time and participated in the 2016 Summer Olympics. South Korea won their group by acquiring 7 points against Germany, Mexico, and Fiji, but they were surprisingly elimininated by Honduras in the quarter-finals.

On 22 November 2016, Shin was appointed manager of the South Korea under-20 team to prepare for the 2017 FIFA U-20 World Cup on home soil. Therefore, he left the senior team to concentrate on the under-20 team. At the World Cup, South Korea finished second in their group with 6 points and advanced to the knockout stage, but lost to Portugal in the round of 16.

After Shin left the South Korean senior team, Stielike made poor results in qualifiers of the 2018 FIFA World Cup and was eventually fired by the Korea Football Association. On 4 July 2017, Shin became the manager of the senior team to replace Stielike. In December, he won the 2017 EAFF E-1 Football Championship, beating arch-rivals Japan in the final fixture 4-1. Despite two goalless draws, South Korea under Shin also obtained qualification to the 2018 FIFA World Cup in Russia. They were drawn in the same group against Sweden, Mexico and defending champions Germany. South Korea lost 0–1 to Sweden and 1–2 to Mexico, but surprised everyone by defeating Germany 2–0.

Indonesia
On 28 December 2019, the Football Association of Indonesia (PSSI) confirmed the appointment of Shin as the Indonesian national team's manager, replacing Simon McMenemy. He was handed a 4-year contract.

After a bad start to his tenure in the second round of 2022 World Cup qualification, he led Indonesia with an average squad age of 23.8 years to the final of the 2020 AFF Championship. In June 2022, he led Indonesia to qualify for the 2023 AFC Asian Cup, ending Indonesia's 16-year absence from the competition, following a 2–1 win against Kuwait and a thumping 7–0 victory against Nepal on the final matchday to clinch qualification.

Prior to 2023 AFC U-20 Asian Cup which scheduled to be held in March 2023, Shin's request to take amount of Persija Jakarta and Persib Bandung players was rejected by its head coaches, Thomas Doll and Luis Milla. The calling was supposed to perform a training camp to prepare the second appearance of national team on the tournament. Shin's absence from the virtual gathering was regretted by Thomas Doll. Nine of Thomas Doll's players was called and declined since they were competing for the league title.

Personal life
Shin has two children, Shin Jae-won and Shin Jae-hyeok.

In Indonesia, his name is widely known by his initial "STY".

On August 25, 2022, Shin signed a contract with adg Company.

Career statistics

Club

International

Results list South Korea's goal tally first.

Managerial statistics

Honours

Player
Yeungnam University
Korean President's Cup: 1991

Seongnam Ilhwa Chunma
K League 1: 1993, 1994, 1995, 2001, 2002, 2003
Korean FA Cup: 1999
Korean League Cup: 1992, 2002, 2004
Korean Super Cup: 2002
Asian Club Championship: 1995
Asian Super Cup: 1996
Afro-Asian Club Championship: 1996
A3 Champions Cup: 2004

Individual
K League Rookie of the Year: 1992
K League 1 Best XI: 1992, 1993, 1994, 1995, 1996, 2000, 2001, 2002, 2003
K League 1 Most Valuable Player: 1995, 2001
K League 1 top goalscorer: 1996
K League 30th Anniversary Best XI: 2013
K League Hall of Fame: 2023

Manager
Seongnam Ilhwa Chunma
AFC Champions League: 2010
Korean FA Cup: 2011

South Korea U23
AFC U-23 Championship runner-up: 2016

South Korea
EAFF Championship: 2017

Indonesia
AFF Championship runner-up: 2020

Indonesia U23
Southeast Asian Games bronze medal: 2021

Individual
Korean FA Cup Best Manager: 2011

References

External links

Shin Tae-yong – National Team Stats at KFA 

1970 births
Living people
Association football midfielders
Seongnam FC managers
Seongnam FC players
Brisbane Roar FC players
K League 1 Most Valuable Player Award winners
K League 1 players
A-League Men players
Footballers at the 1992 Summer Olympics
1996 AFC Asian Cup players
Olympic footballers of South Korea
Expatriate soccer players in Australia
South Korean expatriate sportspeople in Australia
South Korean expatriate footballers
South Korea international footballers
South Korean football managers
South Korean expatriate football managers
South Korean footballers
Yeungnam University alumni
South Korea national football team managers
2018 FIFA World Cup managers
Indonesia national football team managers
South Korean expatriate sportspeople in Indonesia
Sportspeople from North Gyeongsang Province